The Battle of Alzira took place in 1521, as viceroy Diego Hurtado de Mendoza, 1st Count of Melito, attempted to subjugate Alzira and end the Revolt of the Brotherhoods.

In this battle, Alzira was supported by the Agermanado troops of Xàtiva and resisted the attacks for a year, until 9 December 1522, when the troops of the Viceroy entered the city.

Province of Valencia
Alzira
Alzira
History of the Valencian Community